Mih Ouensa (sometimes written Mih Ouansa or Mouïaf Ouennsa) is a town and commune, and capital of Mih Ouensa District, in El Oued Province, Algeria. According to the 2008 census it has a population of 15,593, up from 11,779 in 1998, and a population growth rate of 3.3%.

Climate

Mih Ouensa has a hot desert climate (Köppen climate classification BWh), with very hot summers and mild winters, and very little precipitation throughout the year.

Transportation

Mih Ouensa lies on the N16, which connects Touggourt to El Oued. From El Oued the road continues northeast to Tébessa. A local road also leads north to Ourmas.

Education

2.0% of the population has a tertiary education, and another 6.6% has completed secondary education. The overall literacy rate is 63.3%, and is 71.3% among males and 55.0% among females.

Localities
The commune of Mih Ouensa is composed of 14 localities:

Mih Ouensa
Oudeï Tork
Riad Ouansa
Adel Ouansa (Territories) 
El Kataf
Touam
Bent Lemk Oucher
Bougoufa
Sahabane
Mih Moulahoum
Baboukha
Bel Ghit
Draa Lahmar
Djérada
Mih Lachache
Hériouila

References

Neighbouring towns and cities

Communes of El Oued Province
Cities in Algeria